Conus sukhadwalai is a species of sea snail, a marine gastropod mollusk in the family Conidae, the cone snails and their allies.

Like all species within the genus Conus, these snails are predatory and venomous. They are capable of "stinging" humans, therefore live ones should be handled carefully or not at all.

Description
The size of the shell varies between 37 mm and 50 mm.

Distribution
This marine species occurs off Southern India.

References

 Röckel, D., and da Motta, A. J., 1983. Eine neue Conus-Art aus der Umgebung von Madras (Süd-Indien). Archiv für Molluskenkunde, 114(1/3): 1 -5 .
 Tucker J.K. & Tenorio M.J. (2009) Systematic classification of Recent and fossil conoidean gastropods. Hackenheim: Conchbooks. 296 pp.
 Puillandre N., Duda T.F., Meyer C., Olivera B.M. & Bouchet P. (2015). One, four or 100 genera? A new classification of the cone snails. Journal of Molluscan Studies. 81: 1–23

External links
 The Conus Biodiversity website
 Cone Shells – Knights of the Sea
 

sukhadwalai
Gastropods described in 1983